The World's a Stage is a 1922 American silent drama film directed by Colin Campbell and starring Dorothy Phillips, Bruce McRae, and Kenneth Harlan.

Cast
 Dorothy Phillips as Jo Bishop 
 Bruce McRae as John Brand 
 Kenneth Harlan as Wallace Foster 
 Otis Harlan as Richard Manseld Bishop 
 Jack McDonald as Property Man

References

Bibliography
 Donald W. McCaffrey & Christopher P. Jacobs. Guide to the Silent Years of American Cinema. Greenwood Publishing, 1999.

External links

1922 films
1922 drama films
1920s English-language films
American silent feature films
Silent American drama films
American black-and-white films
Films directed by Colin Campbell
1920s American films